The Benelli M1 is a semi-automatic shotgun manufactured by Benelli Armi S.P.A., and the first of the "Benelli Super 90" series of semi-auto shotguns. Introduced in 1986, it is available in several versions for civilian, law enforcement and military use.

The M1 was succeeded by the Benelli M2, Benelli M3, and Benelli M4 models.

Design
The M1 features the proprietary Benelli recoil system, known for its reliability and easy maintenance. The standard model features an aluminum alloy receiver and tubular magazine, and is available with a standard or pistol grip stocks. The M1 Super 90 can be fitted with traditional iron sights, or ghost ring diopter sights. Mounts are available for laser pointers and tactical flashlights.

Due to the inertia recoil system, the M1 should use heavier loads to cycle properly. However, because the action is inertia driven instead of the traditional gas cycling operation it can fire and reliably cycle lighter loads.

References

External links
American Rifleman's Exploded-View Diagram of the Benelli M1 Super 90 Montefeltro Edition

Benelli Armi SpA
Semi-automatic shotguns of Italy
Weapons and ammunition introduced in 1986